HDMS Elephanten (from the Order of the Elephant) was a ship of the line of the Royal Dano-Norwegian Navy that served from 1703 to 1728. There were three other Danish ships-of-the line of the same name, dating from 1684, 1741 and 1773. The ship was sometimes referred to as Nye Elefant to differentiate from others of similar name. For much of her service career, which coincided with the Great Northern War, Elephanten was the flagship of the Danish fleet active in the Baltic Sea.

Ship's career

In 1710 Elephanten participated in the Battle of Køge Bay, where she served as flagship for Admiral Ulrik Gyldenløve. Elephanten remained Gyldenløve's flagship until 1712 when the Danish fleet was heavily involved in the ongoing siege of Stralsund. Captain  was the flag captain during 1711 and 1712.

This was a period in which the fleet of 15 ships-of-the-line escorted a squadron and fleet of troop transports under Christen Thomesen Sehested to Pomerania and which included the successful Battle of Rügen. Dos was again flag captain to Admiral Raben on Elephanten in 1718.

In early October 1715 Gyldenløve again took command of Denmark's Baltic fleet, again flying his flag in Elephanten. For three weeks Ulrich Kaas was his flag captain before his own promotion to Rear Admiral, then Rasmus Krag took over.

Elephanten continued to lead the Danish fleet in the Baltic throughout 1716 and 1717 with Admiral Gyldenløve in command. Commodore (later Admiral) , was the flag captain in these later stages.

1726
By the end of the Great Northern War much of the Danish fleet was seriously dilapidated and in need of refitting and repair. The refitting of Elephanten at the Danish naval base of Holmen was mismanaged and expensive, resulting in a ship that was unfit for service, for which Ole Judichær was blamed.

Fate
She was scuttled in 1728 to create the artificial island Elefanten at Holmen, Copenhagen.

The ship's former anchor was recovered from the Bay of Køge in 1979. In October the same year it was inaugurated as a local landmark in a donation from Sejlklubben Greve Strand in connection with the celebration of the harbour's 50 years' anniversary.

Notes

References

Citations
Royal Danish Naval Museum - List of Ships Names  - for details of most ships which have served in the Royal Danish Navy
Byvandring 6 - A guide to the area of Holmen, City of Copenhagen for walking or cycling (for Elefanten see section 6.6) - in Danish . Copyright forfatterne og Systime A/S 2019
Royal Danish Naval Museum Skibregister for record cards where they exist

External links

 Source
 Model 

1700s ships
Ships of the line of the Royal Dano-Norwegian Navy
Ships designed by Ole Judichær
Great Northern War
Ships built in Copenhagen
Holmen, Copenhagen